Grzybowo  is a village in the administrative district of Gmina Kościerzyna, within Kościerzyna County, Pomeranian Voivodeship, in northern Poland.

Location

History
For details of the history of the region, see History of Pomerania.

Population
The village has a population of 173.

References

Grzybowo